The 2017 Gwangju Open was a professional tennis tournament played on hard courts. It was the 2nd edition of the tournament which was part of the 2017 ATP Challenger Tour. It took place in Gwangju, South Korea between 18 and 24 September 2017.

Singles main-draw entrants

Seeds

 1 Rankings as of 11 September 2017.

Other entrants
The following players received wildcards into the singles main draw:
  Hong Seong-chan
  Kim Cheong-eui
  Park Jun-sang
  Sin Dong-hak

The following players received entry into the singles main draw using a protected ranking:
  Bradley Klahn

The following players received entry from the qualifying draw:
  Yuya Kibi
  Marinko Matosevic
  Makoto Ochi
  Yang Tsung-hua

The following players received entry as lucky losers:
  Lorenzo Frigerio
  Kento Takeuchi

Champions

Singles

  Matthias Bachinger def.  Yang Tsung-hua 6–3, 6–4.

Doubles

  Chen Ti /  Ben McLachlan def.  Jarryd Chaplin /  Luke Saville 2–6, 7–6(7–1), [10–1].

References

Gwangju Open
2017 in South Korean tennis
Gwan